Kingdon Airpark is a general aviation airport located 4 miles southwest of Lodi, California.

History 
During World War II, the airport was designated as Kingsbury Auxiliary Airfield (No 1), and was an auxiliary training airfield for Stockton Army Airfield, California.

See also

 California World War II Army Airfields

References

External links 

Airports in San Joaquin County, California